Weverton Silva de Andrade (born 17 February 2003) is a Brazilian professional footballer who plays as a defender for Cruzeiro.

Career statistics

Club

References

2003 births
Living people
Sportspeople from Goiás
Brazilian footballers
Brazil youth international footballers
Association football defenders
Campeonato Brasileiro Série B players
Cruzeiro Esporte Clube players